Deci (symbol d) is a decimal unit prefix in the metric system denoting a factor of one tenth. Proposed in 1793, and adopted in 1795, the prefix comes from the Latin , meaning "tenth". Since 1960, the prefix is part of the International System of Units (SI).

A frequent use of the prefix is in the unit deciliter (dl), common in food recipes; many European homes have a deciliter measure for flour, water, etc. A common measure in engineering is the unit decibel for measuring ratios of power and root-power quantities, such as sound level and electrical amplification.

Example
The diameter of a compact disc is about 12 centimetres or 1.2 decimetres.

References

SI prefixes